The Halifax Club is a private club in Halifax, Nova Scotia that was established in 1862.  The club serves as a meeting place for business-minded men and women. It is a place where they can "meet, toast the day's successes, dine or simply relax in a warm atmosphere of history and tradition." The Club has a substantial art collection including a self-portrait of Benjamin West and a painting by Robert Field.  The Club was built by George Lang.

History 
On January 22, 1862, 15 distinguished gentlemen of Halifax met in the Hollis Street office of Robie Uniacke to organize what was to become known as The Halifax Club. These men, whose names served as a Who’s Who of Halifax at that time, were Edward Kenny, William A. Black, Mathers Byles Almon, Edward Binney, Captain W.W. Lyttleton, Colonel W.J. Myers, S.A. White, James C. Cogswell, Henry Pryor, John Tobin, Robert Morrow, Alfred G. Jones, M.B. Almon, Jr. and William Cunard.  Many of these men were also members of the Charitable Irish Society of Halifax, North British Society and the Chebucto Grays.

Notable members
 Sir Robert Borden
 Sir Sandford Flemming
 Thomas Head Raddall
 Alexander Keith (Canadian politician)
 Charles Tupper
Edward Kenny
 Sidney Culverwell Oland

Gallery

See also 
History of Nova Scotia
List of gentlemen's clubs in Canada
Military history of Nova Scotia

References 

Texts
 The Halifax Club 1862-1987 (1986)
 The rules of the Halifax Club: established January 20th, 1862 (1863)

Endnotes

External links
 The Halifax Club - Official Website

Organizations based in Nova Scotia
Buildings and structures in Halifax, Nova Scotia
Clubs and societies in Canada
1862 establishments in Nova Scotia
Gentlemen's clubs in Canada